Schufelberger Egg Pass (el. 990 m.) is a mountain pass in the Alps in the canton of Zürich in Switzerland.

It connects Wernetshausen (in the municipality of Hinwil) and Gibswil (in the municipality of Fischenthal).

See also
 List of highest paved roads in Europe
 List of mountain passes

Mountain passes of Switzerland
Mountain passes of the Alps
Mountain passes of the canton of Zürich